Tatun Volcanoes, a group of volcanoes located in northern Taiwan, is located 15 km north of Taipei, and lies to the west of Keelung. It just adjoins the northern coast of the Taiwan island. The volcano group was a result of episodic volcanism between 2.8 and 0.2 Ma. As of 2005, some geothermal activity was occurring and gas fumaroles were active among these volcanoes. Observations on Tatun Volcano Group suggest that magma chambers probably still exist under the land surface of northern Taiwan.

History
The north of the island is where evidence of volcanic activity is most obvious. In the early 20th century, the North Range of hills, also called Daitonzan from Japanese or Twa-tun from Hokkien, was recognized as having an abundance of sulfur deposits. There were three craters in the North Range between Tamsui and Kimpauli (approx. modern-day Jinshan).

See also
Qixing Mountain (Taipei)
Yangmingshan National Park

References

Volcanoes of Taiwan
Volcanic groups
Landforms of Taipei